The Sweden Democrats (SD ) is a nationalist and right-wing populist political party in Sweden. As of 2022, it is the largest member of Sweden's right-wing governing bloc to which it provides confidence and supply, and is the second largest party in the Riksdag.

The party describes itself as social conservative with a nationalist foundation. The party has also been variously characterised by academics, political commentators, and media as national-conservative, anti-immigration, anti-Islam, Eurosceptic, and far-right. The Sweden Democrats reject the far-right label, saying that it no longer represents the party's political beliefs.  Founded in 1988, the Sweden Democrats originally had its roots in Swedish nazism, as well as white nationalism, but the party began distancing itself from its past during the late 1990s and early 2000s. Under the leadership of Jimmie Åkesson since 2005, the SD underwent a process of reform by expelling hardline members and moderating its platform. Today, the Sweden Democrats officially reject both fascism and Nazism on their platform.

The Sweden Democrats oppose current Swedish immigration and integration policies, instead supporting stronger restrictions on immigration. The party supports closer cooperation with Nordic countries, but is against further European integration. The Sweden Democrats are critical of multiculturalism and support having a common national and cultural identity, which they believe improves social cohesion. The party supports the Swedish welfare state but is against providing welfare to people who are not Swedish citizens and permanent residents of Sweden, a policy known as welfare chauvinism. The Sweden Democrats support a mixed market economy combining ideas from the centre-left and centre-right. The party supports same-sex marriage, civil unions for gay couples, and sex reassignment surgery but prefers that children be raised in a traditional nuclear family. The Sweden Democrats support keeping Sweden's nuclear power plants in order to mitigate climate change but argues that other countries should reduce their greenhouse gas emissions instead of Sweden, which the party believes is doing enough to reduce their emissions. The Sweden Democrats support generally increasing minimum sentences for crimes, as well as increasing police resources and personnel. The party supports increasing the number of Swedish Army brigades and supports raising Sweden's defense spending. The Sweden Democrats are a member of the European Conservatives and Reformists group in the European Parliament.

Support for the Sweden Democrats has grown steadily since the 1990s and the party crossed the 4% threshold necessary for parliamentary representation for the first time during the 2010 Swedish general election, polling 5.7% and gaining 20 seats in the Riksdag. This increase in popularity has been compared by international media to other similar anti-immigration movements in Europe. The party received increased support in the 2018 Swedish general election, when it polled 17.5% and secured 62 seats in parliament, becoming the third largest party in Sweden. The Sweden Democrats were formerly isolated in the Riksdag until the late 2010s, with other parties maintaining a policy of refusing cooperation with them. In 2019, the leader of the Christian Democrats, Ebba Busch announced that her party was ready to start negotiations with the Sweden Democrats in the Riksdag, as did Moderate Party leader Ulf Kristersson. In the 2022 Swedish general election, the party ran as part of a broad right-wing alliance with those two parties and the Liberals, and came second overall with 20.5% of the vote. Following the election and the Tidö Agreement, it was negotiated that SD agreed to support a Moderate Party-led government together with the Christian Democrats and the Liberals,. It is the first time that SD holds direct influence over the government.

History

Early years (1988–1995) 

SD claims 6 February 1988 as the date of its foundation, although observers tend to see the party's foundation as part of a complex decade-long series of events, with some even calling into question whether a meeting took place on 6 February.

Initially, the party did not have a single centralized leader and was instead fronted by two alternating spokespeople before Anders Klarström became the party's sole official chairman and head of the Sweden Democrats' national board in 1989.

According to Expo, it is generally agreed that the Sweden Democrats have never been a Nazi party, although some of the SD's early members had previously been connected with Swedish fascist and white nationalist groups. The party's first auditor, Gustaf Ekström, was a Waffen-SS veteran and had been a member of the national socialist party Svensk Socialistisk Samling in the1940s. The SD's first chairman Anders Klarström had been briefly active in the neo-Nazi  ("Nordic Realm Party") as a teenager before claiming to have distanced himself from it by the time he became SD leader. The SD's logo from the 1990s until 2006 was a version of the torch used by the British National Front. Academic Duncan McDonnell has argued it is debatable as to whether the SD itself was ever explicitly a neo-Nazi movement, but it was widely known to publicly align itself with extreme fringe politics and faced criticism in late 1980s and early 1990s for attracting skinheads to its public events. The SD also encountered controversy for some its early policy ideas before 1990, which included a proposal to repatriate most immigrants who came to Sweden from 1970, banning adoption of foreign born children and reinstating the death penalty.

The party promoted concerts by the Swedish offshoot of Rock Against Communism and sponsored music of the nationalist Viking rock band Ultima Thule. Various party officials today acknowledge that being fans of Ultima Thule's music factored prominently in their decision to become politically engaged. Early on, the party recommended international connections to its members such as the National Democratic Party of Germany, the American National Association for the Advancement of White People (founded by David Duke) and publications like the Nazi Nation Europa and Nouvelle École, a newspaper that advocates racial biology and the British neo-Nazi Combat 18 movement.

Moderation and growth (1995–2010) 

In 1995, Klarström was replaced as party chairman by Mikael Jansson, a former member of the Centre Party. Jansson strove to make the party more respectable and, after skinheads started to impose on party meetings, the wearing of any kind of political uniform was formally banned in 1996. Also in 1996 it was revealed that a party member, Tina Hallgren, had been to a party meeting of National Socialist Front posing in a Nazi uniform. Opposition to the party have mistakenly mixed these two events together and falsely claim that she was wearing the uniform at a rally of the Sweden Democrats and that it was because of this that the uniform ban came about. During the early 1990s, the party became more influenced by the French National Front, as well as the Freedom Party of Austria, the Danish People's Party, German The Republicans and Italian National Alliance. SDreceived economic support for the 1998 election from the French National Front, and became active in Le Pen's Euronat from the same time. By the end of the decade, the party took further steps to moderate itself by softening its policies on immigration and capital punishment. In 1999, the SD left Euronat although the youth wing remained affiliated until 2002. In 2001 the most extreme faction was expelled from the party, leading to the formation of the more radical National Democrats which in turn resulted in many of the SD's remaining hardline members leaving for the new party.

During the 2000s the so-called "Scania gang", also known as the "Gang of Four" or "Fantastic Four," which consisted of the youth wing chairman Jimmie Åkesson, as well as Björn Söder, Mattias Karlsson and Richard Jomshof continued and expanded the moderation policy, which included ousting openly extremist members, banning extreme-right activists from attending party events or obtaining membership, and further revising the SD's policy platform. Before the 2002 election, former Moderate Party MP Sten Christer Andersson defected to SD, citing that the party had gotten rid of its extreme-right elements. In 2003 the party declared the Universal Declaration of Human Rights to be a cornerstone of its policies. In 2005, Åkesson defeated Jansson in a leadership contest. Shortly after, the party changed its logo from the flaming torch to one featuring an Anemone hepatica, reminiscent of the party's very first, but short-lived, logo (a stylised Myosotis scorpioides).

The party formally introduced a charter against racism and extremism in 2010 and changed its self-description from “nationalist” to “social conservative” in 2011. In 2012, the leadership also implemented a zero-tolerance policy on breaking the charter.

Entrance into parliament (2010–2014) 

In the 2010 Swedish general election, SDwon representation in the Swedish Riksdag for the first time, with5.7% of the vote and 20MPs.

Sweden Democrat MP William Petzäll was persuaded to leave the party on 26 September 2011 while still retaining his parliamentary seat. This was done because of Petzäll's substance abuse and the problems this might cause for SD'spublic image. Petzäll later died of an overdose and his seat was turned over to Stellan Bojerud in September 2012.

In November 2012, videos from August 2010 were released, in segments, over the course of three days by Swedish newspaper Expressen (a year earlier, Expressen had released the same videos without making much noise). This came to be known as the Iron pipe scandal, although the same videos had already been released on YouTube by Erik Almqvist in 2010. The videos, recorded by MP Kent Ekeroth, featured him along with fellow Sweden Democrats MP Erik Almqvist and Christian Westling. The videos show Almqvist arguing with comedian Soran Ismail: Almqvist is referring to Sweden as "my country, not your country", as an insult to Ismail. They are also shown arguing with a drunken man. A woman can also be seen approaching Kent Ekeroth while filming; he calls her a whore and pushes her out of the way. A few minutes later they are seen picking up iron bars. Coming only a month after party leader Åkesson had instated a zero-tolerance policy towards racism in the party, the release of the video caused Almqvist to leave his position as the party's economic policy spokesperson and his place in the executive committee on 14 November. He excused himself as having been under a lot of pressure and threats of violence at the time. As more segments of the video were released, revealing the other two men's involvement, the party announced on 15 November that Ekeroth would take a break from his position as the party's justice policy spokesman. Almqvist and Ekeroth both took time off from their parliament seats. Sweden Democratic Youth president Gustav Kasselstrand and vice president William Hahne criticised the decision to remove Almqvist and Ekeroth in an op-ed in Dagens Nyheter, arguing that the party should not give in to media pressure.

Only two weeks after Almqvist and Ekeroth were forced to step down, fellow MP Lars Isovaara reported being robbed of his backpack and pushed out of his wheelchair by "two unknown men of an immigrant background". When trying to get into the Riksdag, Isovaara was himself reported by the police for racial abuse against safety guards. The Sweden Democrats initially defended Isovaara, but backed down when Expressen revealed that Isovaara had actually forgotten his backpack at a restaurant, and that the two men had helped him when he fell out of his wheelchair. He left his seat in the Riksdag on 29 November, and was replaced by Markus Wiechel.

Rise in national support (2014–2018) 
In the European election of 2014 SD received 9.67% of votes, winning two seats in the European Parliament and becoming the fifth party of the country. The party later joined the Alliance for Direct Democracy in Europe and the Europe of Freedom and Direct Democracy group.

In the 2014 election the Sweden Democrats received 12.9%of the votes, doubling their support and becoming the third-largest party. The party remained big in Scania and Blekinge; for example in Malmö the party received 14% of the votes, in Landskrona it received 19% of the votes and in Sjöbo a total of 30% rendering the party the largest in that municipality. Other parties, however, remained firm in their decision to isolate them from exerting influence. Out of 29 constituencies electing parliamentarians, the party was the second largest in "Scania North & East" while being the third largest party in 25. Although relying heavily on rural areas and the deep south, the party also made strong inroads and results above 15% in some medium-sized central Sweden cities such as Norrköping, Eskilstuna and Gävle, indicating a widening of its voter base in all areas.

Some time after that, Åkesson announced he would go on sick leave due to burnout. Mattias Karlsson was appointed to temporarily take over Åkesson's duties as party leader.

On 23 March 2015, it was announced that Åkesson would return from his leave of absence to resume his duties as party leader following an interview to be broadcast on the Friday, 27 March instalment of the Skavlan program on SVT, and a subsequent press conference with the Swedish media.

Amid media coverage regarding the high immigration figures and the European migrant crisis, the Sweden Democrats soared in all opinion polls during the summer of 2015, even topping web-based polls from YouGov and Sentio in late summer, with a little over a quarter of the vote. The party also saw rising support in phone-based polls, although the swing was lower.

Entering mainstream politics (2018–2022) 
In early 2018 Alternative for Sweden was founded by members of the Sweden Democrat Youth, who were collectively expelled from the Sweden Democrats in 2015. Three Sweden Democrat members of the Riksdag, Olle Felten, Jeff Ahl and former leader Mikael Jansson subsequently defected to the party.

On 2 July 2018 the two Sweden Democrats MEPs left the EFDD group and moved to the European Conservatives and Reformists group.

In the 2018 Swedish general election, the SD increased its support to 17.5% of the vote, though it did not grow as much as most polls had predicted. According to Emily Schultheis of Foreign Policy, the SD won an ideological victory, as it "effectively set the terms for debate" and forced its rivals to adopt immigration policies similar to its own, and other reporters made similar observations. The SD performed particularly well in Skåne County, having the highest number of voters in 21 out of the county's 33 municipalities. An SVT analysis of the results found that at least 22 seats in 17 city councils would be empty as the Sweden Democrats won more seats than the number of candidates it had. The party also received its first mayor, in Hörby Municipality.

Following the election, Christian Democratic leader Ebba Busch announced that her party was willing to enter negotiations with the Sweden Democrats in the Riksdag. In December 2019, Moderate Party leader Ulf Kristersson held an official meeting with the Sweden Democrat leadership for the first time, despite having previously ruled out negotiating with the party. This led to speculation that the SD could be included in a new centre-right grouping to replace the Alliance which had collapsed after the Centre Party and the Liberal Party left to support the Social Democratic led government.

In October 2018, the Sweden Democrats went into a governing coalitions with the Moderate Party and the Christian Democrats for the first time in Staffanstorp Municipality, Sölvesborg Municipality, Herrljunga Municipality and Bromölla Municipality. In Bromölla, coalition felt apart in 2020, while new coalitions with the SD emerged in Svalöv Municipality (2019), Bjuv Municipality (2020) and Surahammar Municipality (2021).

In 2020, Mattias Karlsson, the former group leader of the Sweden Democrats in the Riksdag founded Oikos, a conservative think-tank which has been alleged to be an "extension of the Sweden Democrats' political project", supposedly also receiving funding from the party.

2022 general election (since 2022)
Ahead of the 2022 Swedish general election, the SD attempted to form a conservative grouping with the Moderates, Christian Democrats and the Liberals and requested ministerial posts in government should the right-wing bloc form a parliamentary majority. During the election, the SD campaigned to reduce asylum migration close to zero, stricter policies on work permits, lower energy bills and a tougher stance on gang violence with longer prison sentences. Preliminary results indicated that the Sweden Democrats had seen their strongest result to date and had overtaken the Moderates to become the second largest party with 20.6% of the vote. The result was confirmed after the election.

In October 2022, the SD was allocated chairmanship of four parliamentary committees for the first time in the Riksdag with party secretary Richard Jomshof appointed to head the Justice Committee, Aron Emilsson the Committee on Foreign Affairs, Tobias Andersson the Committee on Industry and Trade, and Magnus Persson the Committee on the Labour Market.

The party also formed a deal with Moderate leader Ulf Kristersson to provide for the first time in their history parliamentary support to a Moderate Party-led government as part of the Tidö Agreement.

Ideology and political positions 

The Sweden Democrats' current party programme is based on "democratic nationalism" and social conservatism. The party has also stated its main focus to be the areas of immigration, law & order and the elderly. The party also attaches particular importance to its economic and family policy. The SD criticizes multiculturalism in Sweden and emphasizes preserving national heritage. It is also opposed to what it sees as a constant shift of power from Stockholm to the European Union and campaigns to protect Swedish national identity and financial autonomy against the EU.

Nordic Studies scholar Benjamin R. Teitelbaum has called the SD radical nationalist and in 2018 said the party has since evolved to the "softer side" of European populist parties. The party has been described by sociologist Jens Rydgren and political scientist Cas Mudde variously as xenophobic, far-right, racist or right-wing populist. In 2013, a Sveriges Radio journalist called the party xenophobic, which resulted in a complaint lodged to the broadcasting regulator. The Swedish Broadcasting Commission determined that this description was acceptable to use. Commentator on extremism and national security Kateřina Lišaníková observed that the SD had ethnic supremacist and hardline origins through its founders and initial support network, and notes the SD's leadership openly acknowledges its history, but argues the present version of the SD does not match the description of a radical far-right party and is mistakenly labelled as such by media or opponents who focus on the party's early rather than current beliefs. She instead states the SD now resembles a national conservative party with populist elements but does not contradict democratic or constitutional principles. In 2022, British political scientist Matthew Goodwin described the SD as having transformed itself from an extreme past to becoming part of a broader European family of national-populist parties which combine social and cultural conservative nationalism and populism but are opposed to fascist, anti-democratic and revolutionary ideas.

Oscar Sjöstedt, the SD's financial spokesperson, places the party around the centre on the left–right political spectrum, while leader Jimmie Åkesson has stated that they are parallel with the Moderate Party. The party formally rejects Nazism, and in recent years has increasingly distanced itself from other European ultra-nationalist or far-right parties. In spite of this, a 2022 report by Swedish researchers Acta Publica claimed to have found 289 Swedish politicians who expressed racist or Nazi views, with 214 of them being members of the SD.

Immigration 
The Sweden Democrats believe that current Swedish immigration and integration policies have been a national failure. In a statement filed before the Riksdag Committee on Migration in August 2020, SD claims that Sweden's "irresponsible" immigration and asylum policies have subjected Sweden to an on-going "long-term, albeit low-intensity crisis". Their official policy brief states that the party "welcomes those who contribute to our [Sweden's] society, who follow our laws and respect our customs. On the other hand, anyone who comes here and exploits our systems, commits crimes or exposes our citizens to danger is not welcome." When handling asylum seekers, the party supports protecting national sovereignty in regards to Sweden's decisions on migration and border control, as well as "the principle of first safe country", meaning that asylum seekers should only be able to seek asylum in the first safe country that they arrive in. Until such legislation is realized, SD supports setting limits on the right to welfare and making cultural integration mandatory. The party opposes offering permanent residency to asylum seekers, believing that temporary residency should be the standard for those who claim asylum in Sweden. SD supports Sweden eventually accepting refugees exclusively through the UNHCR resettlement programme in accordance with a quota based on each municipality's capacity. The party also supports giving priority to persecuted secular, Christian, former Muslim and other religious or sexual minorities fleeing war or death for apostasy believing that such individuals are less likely to be offered refuge elsewhere. Ahead of the 2022 Swedish general election, the party campaigned to tighten the rules in the Swedish Aliens Act to the strictest possible level within European law and encourage voluntary re-migration of asylum seekers and immigrants who are economically inactive or culturally unassimilated.

Historically, SD sought to repatriate most immigrants and ban immigration entirely; however, these policies were moderated in the 1990s before being scrapped altogether. Presently, SD wishes to strongly restrict and place more controls on immigration, and instead give generous support to immigrants who do not want to assimilate into Swedish society to emigrate back to their country of origin and change laws to revoke residency or citizenship of those who engage in illegal activity. As more state funds are made free from funding mass immigration, SD believes that Sweden will be better able to help refugees and economic migrants in their home areas. SD has referred to the recommendations from the United Nations High Commissioner for Refugees (UNHCR) which state that the return of refugees should be the solution to refugee problems. Torbjörn Kastell (former party secretary from 2003 to 2004) said in 2002 that the party wanted "a multicultural world, not a multicultural society".  SD also favours assimilation over integration of immigrants from non-European backgrounds, arguing that integration is a meet in the middle approach and that Swedes should not have to bear the burden over what the party claims have been reckless immigration policies. In 2017, members of the Sweden Democrats' leadership defended comments made by then US President Donald Trump in response to Trump's assertion that Sweden's migration and asylum policies had led to a rise of terrorism and crime in Sweden. However, following the 2022 Russian invasion of Ukraine the SD supported accepting and accommodating Ukrainian refugees in Sweden.

The SD wants European governments to construct a security wall along the European border with Turkey in response to illegal immigration, terrorism and incursions by the Grey Wolves into Greece. It also calls on Europe to commonly adopt a migration system based on the Australian model to prevent human trafficking across the Mediterranean which the party states enables illegal immigrants and would-be terrorists to reach Sweden. SD calls for compulsory measures for immigrants to be employed, learn the Swedish language, be put through an assimilation program, and be subject to a language and social skills test before becoming eligible for citizenship. The party also supports increased spending on border patrol forces, expulsion of illegal immigrants and foreign-born criminals, repatriations of Schengen area migrants who move to Sweden to make a living from street begging, changes in the law to enable the government to strip foreign-born Swedish nationals of their citizenship if found guilty of a serious crime or involvement in terrorism, penalties against employers who use foreign and undocumented labor to circumvent Swedish working conditions and stricter laws against family migration.

In recent years SDhas tried to approach the immigration policy of the Danish People's Party, which from 2001 to 2011 provided parliamentary support for the former Danish liberal/conservative government in return for a tightening of Danish immigration policies and stricter naturalisation laws.

Foreign policy 
The Sweden Democrats support close political co-operation within the Nordic sphere, but are eurosceptic and strictly against further EU integration and cession of Swedish sovereignty to the European Union. The party opposes EU regulation over Swedish tax and domestic affairs and calls for the national sovereignty and cultural identity of European nations to be prioritized over the EU's political ambitions. SD rejects joining the Economic and Monetary Union by opposing the Euro currency and favors keeping the krona. They also seek to reduce Swedish financial contributions to Brussels, renegotiate Swedish membership of the Schengen Agreement, protect freedom of speech and the free access to the internet from EU copyright bills, and are against the accession of Turkey to the European Union. The SD states that it supports pan-European political cooperation to combat cross-border organized crime, illegal immigration, Islamism, terrorism and environmental challenges but opposes creating a fully combined EU army or policies that could lead to the creation of a Federal European Superstate. The SD states that if the EU cannot be reformed and tries to transform itself into a Superstate, Sweden should immediately reconsider its membership via a referendum and prepare to exit the EU. The party also calls for Sweden to renegotiate its membership with the EU and an amendment to the Swedish constitution to make it mandatory that proposed EU bills and treaties be first put to a public vote in Sweden.

The Sweden Democrats are supportive of Israel and favors recognising Jerusalem as Israel's capital and proposes moving the Swedish embassy there, though Israel has stated it does not have and it does not wish to have any contact with the party "due its roots in Nazism".  In 2011, SD was the only Swedish political party to vote against Swedish involvement in the 2011 military intervention in Libya. SD has advocated a "neutral" position on the Syrian Civil War and sent a delegation to meet with Syrian officials in 2017. SD also supports the creation of an independent Kurdish state and for the Armenian genocide to be formally recognised by the international community.

The party supports closer military cooperation with neighboring Nordic countries and previously opposed Swedish membership of NATO, instead calling for an alignment without full membership. However, following the Russian invasion of Ukraine the SD leadership announced it would consider changing its policy to endorse NATO membership and support joining if Finland also applied for NATO membership. The SD has also taken a strongly pro-Ukraine position following the invasion and has called on Sweden and Western governments to help the Ukrainian people defend their homeland.

In 2022 an analysis of votes relating to Russia in the European Parliament found that the Sweden Democrats were the 10th-most critical party in the parliament having voted against Russian interests 93 percent of the time. The report found that among all Swedish parties the Sweden Democrats were the most critical of Russia.

National identity and culture 
SD values a strong, common national and cultural identity, believing this to be one of the most basic cornerstones of a functioning democracy. Minimizing linguistic, cultural and religious differences in society has a positive effect on societal cohesion, according to the party. The Swedish nation is defined "in terms of loyalty, a common language and common culture." A requirement for becoming a member of the Swedish nation is to either "be born in it or [...] by actively choosing to be a part of it." For these reasons among others, SDfirmly rejects multiculturalism.

In an interview for Dagens Nyheter, Second Deputy Speaker of the Riksdag and then-party secretary Björn Söder elaborated on the SDparty programme with respect to its views on national identity by saying that he personally did not think people with dual national identities in Sweden would necessarily identify themselves as Swedish. Although an immigrant of any ethnic background in theory can become a Swedish citizen, they would have to adapt and be assimilated in order to be considered Swedish in the cultural sense. Björn Söder stated that the officially recognised Swedish minority peoples (e.g. Sami, Tornedalians and Jews) in many cases have dual cultural identities and that they probably would be proud of both heritages. It was widely interpreted that Söder had stated in the interview that Jews cannot be Swedish unless they abandon their Jewish identity. Söder's comments were understood to be anti-semitic and caused Swedish parliamentary groups and party leaders to call for Björn Söder's resignation. The Simon Wiesenthal Center listed the statement as number six on their list of the top ten most anti-semitic events of 2014. Söder responded in The Jerusalem Post, denying the charges of anti-semitism and claiming Dagens Nyheter had taken his statements out of context.

The Sweden Democrats advocates a cultural policy that would strip funding for multicultural initiatives and strengthen support for traditional Swedish culture. This agenda has often manifested itself as opposition to state funding of immigrant cultural organisations and festivals, and support for traditional Swedish craft, folk music, and folk dance groups. The party also tends to oppose state support for cultural initiatives deemed provocative or elitist. A 2014 letter signed by 52Swedish anthropologists, criticised the Sweden Democrats' use of the terms "culture" (kultur ) and "anthropology" (antropologi ), claiming their views on culture were "essentialist and obsolete", clarifying that culture is "dynamic" and "in constant change".

The Sweden Democrats criticise modern art and have accused local councils of wasting public money on what it calls "provocative" art. The SD want citizens to be able to vote in local referendums on public art displayed near schools, public transport stations and town centres. "The important thing is that what is expressed in the public environment is anchored to the citizens and especially the local residents who are most often in the environment so that they feel an identification", says the party's cultural spokesperson Aron Emilsson. Sweden Democrats mayor in Sölvesborg Louise Erixon claimed "There's a big division between what the general public thinks is beautiful and interesting and what a tiny cultural elite thinks is exciting."

The Sweden Democrats also support a ban on the burqa and niqab in public places, are against proposals to publicly broadcast the Islamic call to prayer from minarets, and want tougher enforcement of existing laws against female genital mutilation, honor violence and social segregation. The SD also want Swedish to remain Sweden's sole official language in state funded schools, government agencies and public funded media. It also supports prohibiting the hijab in primary schools, arguing that while it is not opposed to hijabs in general, the choice to wear it should be made on an individual basis when a child reaches adulthood. The SD is strongly opposed to sharia law being incorporated into the Swedish legal system.

Economy and welfare 
The Sweden Democrats have described themselves as supporters of the Swedish welfare state, labour rights and the public sector, but argue that welfare should be restricted to Swedish citizens and permanent residents. The party argues that foreign-born nationals must show proof of legal residence, paid taxes and financial self-support for a certain period to become eligible for welfare. In its platform, the SD claims that its economic policies are neither left or right-wing, but designed to improve conditions for small and medium-sized companies, self-employed citizens and entrepreneurs to boost employment and stimulate the economy, as opposed to what it describes as "constructed jobs" created by the state to reduce unemployment but hold no long term benefit for the Swedish economy or career paths for the people who work them. SD wants to abolish the Swedish Employment Service in its current form and replace it with a new authority for the supervision and close regulation of private employment services to ensure large corporations do not exploit or undercut Swedish workers. The party supports affordable and free access to public healthcare for Swedish nationals.

Political author Anders Backlund described the party as "economically centrist," leaning towards economic nationalism (in contrast to the other Swedish conservative parties who tend to favour open free markets and global cosmopolitan philosophies) and supporting a mixed market economy combining centre-left and centre-right ideas, as well as promoting "welfare chauvinist" policies which blend national-populism with socio-economics. According to political scientist Johan Martinsson: "In economic terms, the party is more centrist and pragmatic, with a mixture of left and right-wing proposals".

Family and LGBT 
The Sweden Democrats consider children raised in a nuclear family as the preferred option for the child's development. Those not raised by their biological parents should have the right to associate with or at least find out who they were. SD has been critical of adoption and artificial insemination for same-sex couples and polyamorous people. The party now fully supports same-sex marriage and civil partnerships for gay couples but believes the ultimate decision to perform ceremonies should be decided by the individual religious institution rather than the state.

SD previously opposed government sanctioned adoption to single people, same-sex couples and polyamorous relationships unless the adopting party are close relatives or already have a close relationship with the child.

Historically, members of SD have criticized a so-called "Homosex Lobby" but the party has changed its position on LGBT in Swedish society. Party leader Jimmie Åkesson has expressed concerns that what he describes as the gradual Islamisation of Sweden will eventually lead to the rights of sexual minorities being violated.

Throughout the early 2000s, SD-Kuriren (the official SD party newspaper) regularly published articles criticizing LGBT events and describing homosexuality as "perversion", before moderating itself alongside a shift in party ideology. A blog post claiming Stockholm Pride sexualised young children and equating homosexuality with pedophilia titled Botten måste snart vara nådd (Soon enough we'll hit rock bottom) was published by SD Party secretary Björn Söder on 1 August 2007. The post was widely criticised in the Swedish media as an attack on LGBT people.

An unofficial gay pride parade called Pride Järva was organised by SD member and former party magazine editor Jan Sjunnesson in the Stockholm suburbs of Tensta and Husby, two areas with large immigrant populations. The event was disavowed by the official Stockholm Pride organisation and the Swedish Federation for Lesbian, Gay, Bisexual and Transgender Rights; in a joint statement both organisations called Sjunnesson "a person who's spreading hatred towards Muslims on social media [and] who's not supporting LGBT rights". Approximately 30 people participated in Pride Järva, with a larger amount of LGBT and heterosexual anti-racist counter protestors arriving to oppose them.

In recent years, the SD has shifted its stance to supporting LGBT rights and same-sex parenting through updating its policies on LGBT issues. In its current platform, the SD states "everyone must be treated equally, regardless of sexual orientation, and discrimination must be combated." In a 2018 interview, SD member of the Riksdag and gender-equality spokesperson Paula Bieler stated that homophobes "are not welcome in our party."

The SD supports sex reassignment surgery as long as the motive behind it is mental wellbeing.

The party also calls for a ban on child, polygamous and forced marriages, as well as harsher penalties for honor violence.

Gender equality and social justice 
SD opposes any "negative or positive special treatment on the basis of gender, age, sexual orientation, nationality or ethnic origin" in the labour market.

The party maintains that, collectively, there are biological differences between men and women, some of which that cannot be "observed with the naked eye". Perceived differences between men and women in regards to preference, behaviour and life choices exist due to each individual's choices and does not necessarily have to be "problematic, the result of discrimination nor the result of an oppressive gender power structure".

Environment 
The party argues that, while Sweden should maintain its "active role in global climate cooperation", other countries should reduce their emissions, as it believes Sweden to already be doing enough on that front. The party advocates keeping nuclear power plants as a prominent energy source in Sweden, believing it to be an efficient way to mitigate climate change. They also advocate investing in climate research internationally and funding climate action on a global scale.

Law and order and security 
The Sweden Democrats support generally increased minimum sentences as well as increased resources and personnel for the police. SD wishes to instate the possibility of life imprisonment without parole for the worst crimes and to repatriate foreign citizens found guilty of serious crimes. SD also wants to establish a public register of individuals convicted for certain sexual crimes.

SD previously supported the reinstatement of capital punishment before dropping it as an official policy after the party program was updated in 1998, although individuals within the party continue to support the death penalty for serious crimes such as murder and infanticide.

The SD is also opposed to repatriating and offering state funded assistance to Swedish citizens who joined ISIS.

Defense 
SD wants to increase the number of Swedish Army brigades to seven from today's two.

The party has stated that it would seek to raise Sweden's defense spending to 2–2.5% of GDP.

Monarchy 
The party is a supporter of the Swedish monarchy playing a constitutional and cultural role in Swedish life, but also supports an amendment to the constitution that obligates the Riksdag to elect a new monarch in the event of there being no heir to the throne.

Other public policies 
SD wishes to lower the tax rate for the elderly, as well as increase subsidised housing for the elderly. SD also wishes to allocate additional resources to municipalities in order to provide seniors with greater food assistance and, in general, improve their quality of life. SD has also emphasised a desire to crack down on abuses and crimes of which the elderly are particular targets.

The Sweden Democrats are critical of the special rights given to the indigenous Sami people of northern Sweden. In 2008 the party accepted a motion against the rights to reindeer husbandry. They have argued that those "who do not involve themselves with reindeer husbandry are treated as second class citizens" and that the privileges the herders have are "undemocratic". They want to restructure the councils and funds that are used to benefit the Sami population, so that they are used "regardless of ethnic identity and business operations". They also want to abolish the Sami Parliament, which claims special privileges for an "ethnic minority while the society claims equal rights for others".

International relations
In its early days, the Sweden Democrats was known to associate itself with both native Swedish and wider European extreme-right activist groups and parties. During the 1990s, the Sweden Democrats began distancing itself from such groups and made connections with the French National Front and Jean Marie Le Pen through his Euronat initiative, but otherwise the party did not actively seek formal relationships outside of Sweden. After party left Euronat, it became more influenced by the neighboring Danish People's Party. The SD has also had some contacts with the Austrian FPÖ, the Dutch Party for Freedom and Forum for Democracy, and the Flemish Vlaams Belang. The Danish People's Party was initially reluctant to collaborate with the SD until 2010 when Pia Kjærsgaard travelled to Sweden to help with the party's general election campaign. Following the European election of 2014 there was some speculation that the SD would enter a grouping with other European nationalist parties led by Marine Le Pen. However, the party began to distance itself from other European far-right parties and elected to become a member of the more moderate right-wing Europe of Freedom and Direct Democracy group with the UK Independence Party. In 2015, SD began forging closer relations with the Danish People's Party and in 2018 announced an official cooperation pact with the Finns Party. All three parties are members of the Nordic Freedom group.

Since 2018, the SD has been a member of the European Conservatives and Reformists group and the European Conservatives and Reformists Party and presently sits alongside Brothers of Italy, the Spanish Vox party, the Flemish N-VA, Polish Law & Justice, and JA21 from the Netherlands. Outside of the EU, SD has had informal contacts with the British Conservative Party and the US Republican Party. Individual politicians of the Norwegian Progress Party have also called for more collaboration with the SD.

Reception and controversies 
During the 1980s and early 1990s, many outspoken far-right and Nazi advocates were involved with the party. It was founded by, among others, the Swedish Waffen-SS veteran Gustaf Ekström and members of both older Nazi and neo-Nazi organisations. In its early days, the SD also had a reputation for attracting biker and skinhead gangs to its rallies. The party had flyers printed by the French National Front in the 1998 general election, and was financially backed for the 2004 European election by Belgian Bernard Mengal. The party was a member of the Euronat initiative which was set up by Jean-Marie Le Pen. However, as part of the moderation process, the Sweden Democrats have subsequently sought to distance themselves from far-right parties in Europe, including turning down an invitation to join a grouping in the European parliament with the National Front in 2014 and choosing to ally themselves with more moderate parties during the 2014 and 2019 European elections.

Isolation in parliament 
Both before and after the 2010 Swedish general election all the major parties, including the Swedish Social Democrats and the Moderate Party, declared they would not collaborate or work with the Sweden Democrats. The move was described by international pundits as an unofficial cordon sanitaire. The policy of non-cooperation was kept in place for the 2014 Swedish general election. However, at a local level other parties from the Moderates to the Left Party have collaborated or voted in favour of SD initiatives. Following the 2018 general election, which saw the disintegration of the centre-right Alliance, Christian Democrats leader Ebba Busch and Moderates leader Ulf Kristersson signaled an end to the non-cooperation policy and began talks with the SD.

Media boycotts 
The Sweden Democrats have complained about difficulties buying advertising space due to the media banning the party from advertising and have accused media outlets of trying to censor or limit the party's campaign messages during elections which has been criticised by free speech organisations. On 16 June 2006, Dagens Nyheter and Svenska Dagbladet decided to stop their boycott. Expressen, however, still retains a ban on Sweden Democrat advertising. During the 2010 Swedish general election, broadcaster TV4 refused to air a Sweden Democrats campaign video which depicted a Swedish pensioner being outrun by burka-clad women with prams. TV4's decision was criticized by both free speech advocates and politicians from Denmark, including by Danish People's Party leader Pia Kjærsgaard, Venstre and the Conservative People's Party (who reacted to TV4's decision to ban the video by calling for international election observers to be sent to Sweden), and by members of the Norwegian Progress Party who called the decision a "violation of democratic rules." Journalist Hanne Kjöller argued that attempts to censor the SD in 2010 ended up emboldening their support by giving them more publicity.

Muhammad cartoon debate 
After the Danish daily newspaper Jyllands-Posten published twelve cartoons depicting Muhammad and ignited a controversy during the2005 autumn and winter, the Sweden Democrats gave their unreserved support to the publication with reference to the freedom of speech. SDstated that it saw no reason why a Danish newspaper should be forced to abide by Muslim rules and prohibitions regarding expression. When the boycott of Danish products was launched in the Middle East, SDlaunched a "Buy Danish" campaign in support of Danish workers. In 2006 SD entered the Muhammad cartoon debate by publishing a cartoon depicting Muhammad on its youth league (SDU) and SD-Kuriren websites. The cartoon showed Muhammad from behind holding a mirror in front of his face. However, instead of any facial features, the mirror showed only a blank head. The cartoon was captioned "Muhammad's Face".

The publication attracted the attention of the Swedish government, which informed internet service provider Levonline about the SD's publications. Subsequently, Levonline shut down SD's web page. The Minister for Foreign Affairs, Laila Freivalds, denied any direct interference. However, at the same time, Laila Freivalds condemned the publication as a provocation. Freivalds then resigned from the Persson Cabinet after being accused of interference with press freedom and lying about such actions.

This event spurred debate on government censorship in Sweden. The Sweden Democrats also had a hate speech charge filed against them due to the posted caricature. Similar hate speech charges were filed against other Swedish publishers who had depicted Muhammad. However, these charges were immediately deemed to be unfounded by the Swedish Chancellor of Justice.

The Sweden Democrats originally planned to publish a set of cartoons in their newspaper SD-Kuriren. However, after the controversy erupted, Jimmie Åkesson issued a statement on SD's website on 9 February 2006, stating that they would refrain from further publications online and in print, due to concerns that publishing might spur hostile actions against Swedes and Swedish interests.

The shutdown of the Sweden Democrats' websites was reported to the Committee on the Constitution by the Liberal People's Party leader Lars Leijonborg. SD filed complaints against the Security Service (Säpo) and the Ministry for Foreign Affairs with the Justitiekansler and Justitieombudsmannen, alleging that the government's interference was unconstitutional. The spokesperson of the Green Party, Peter Eriksson, also criticised the involvement of the Ministry for Foreign Affairs in the event.

Racist incidents and expulsions 
The Sweden Democrats have, among all Swedish parliamentary parties, had the largest share of elected municipal representatives resign since the 2010 elections (27.8%). Many of these resignations were brought on by racist statements or actions by these representatives.

In November 2012, party spokesperson Erik Almqvist resigned after he had been caught on tape making racist and sexist statements. Another video later surfaced, showing how Almqvist, in addition to party spokesperson Kent Ekeroth and party official Christian Westling were arming themselves with iron pipes before they sought out a confrontation with Soran Ismail, a Swedish comedian of Kurdish descent. In November 2012, parliamentarian Lars Isovaara resigned after accusing two people of foreign origin of stealing his bag (which Isovaara had left at a restaurant) and then proceeding to verbally abuse a security guard of a foreign background. Isovaara's replacement in parliament, Markus Wiechel, was found in April 2013 to have referred to a group of black people as "monkeys" in a Facebook comment back in 2011. Wiechel later apologised and stated the comment had been in reference to a video of a tribal witch burning in Africa.

In March 2013, 12 individuals were thrown out of the party for their involvement in neo-Nazi or other extremist movements. In November 2013, parliamentarian and then vice party leader Jonas Åkerlund gained attention for having called immigrants "parasites" during a broadcast on SD's own radio station in 2002, after the recording was publicly rediscovered. In his defence, Åkerlund stated that he only said it to provoke people. In September 2014, the party chairman of the local Stockholm branch, Christoffer Dulny was asked to resign from his position after it was found he had previously posted mocking comments about immigrants, calling them "shameless liars" on alternative media sites. He also resigned from parliament on the same day.

In October 2016, a video of the parliamentarian and economic policy spokesperson Oscar Sjöstedt laughing at antisemitic jokes was released by a former school friend of his who also accused Sjöstedt of chanting fascist slogans. Whilst at a party believed to have been organized by the neo-Nazi group Info-14 in 2011 when Sjöstedt was a member of the SD's youth wing, he laughingly told a story about former co-workers with Nazi sympathies mocking Jews and comparing them to sheep. Following an investigation by the party, Sjöstedt stated that a friend had invited him to the party but he had walked out upon discovering who had organized it and denied expressing fascist statements. During the same month, the parliamentarian and second vice party leader Carina Herrstedt was confronted with having sent an allegedly racist, antisemitic, homophobic and anti-romanyist email to her then spouse in 2011. The email, which had been leaked from the party's internal servers, for instance contained phrases that named black football players from the team Landskrona BoIS as "niggers" whilst also picturing Romani people as thieves. The email was meant to be playful and ironic, Herrstedt told Aftonbladet.

Between 2015 and 2016 various members of the party were expelled from the SD for expressing extremist or racist views, or because of disagreement with the party's shift towards moderation and social conservatism. In April 2015, the Sweden Democratic Youth leaders were also expelled for these reasons, and the organisation was dissolved shortly after with the mother party issuing a warning for remaining SDU members to leave the youth wing or be expelled from the party. In December 2016, the parliamentarian Anna Hagwall was thrown out of the party after using arguments associated with antisemitism to argue for a bill that she introduced in parliament intended to reduce concentration of media ownership in Sweden.

In September 2017, a report from Dagens ETC found that 14 former municipal representatives of the party had infiltrated the SD in order to financially support the Nordic Resistance Movement, a neo-Nazi organisation, through financial transactions, memberships, or purchases of antisemitic and racist literature or souvenirs. In August 2018, 2 members were kicked out due to purchases of Nazi memorabilia online; following the expulsions, Michael Erlandsson, one of the SD spokesmen, publicly stated that people who "have these types of views and share these types of materials" have no place in the party. 14 candidates were expelled from the party as well after being exposed as former members of neo-Nazi organisations. Referring to the latest expulsions, SD leader Jimmie Åkesson declared that the party "works extremely hard to keep clean".

In March 2022, parliamentarian Roger Richthoff was sacked from his role as party defense spokesman and subsequently expelled from the SD and banned by the party from standing as a candidate for them in the 2022 Swedish general election after posting controversial comments on Twitter, including sharing a video supporting Russia in the 2022 Russian invasion of Ukraine in which several antisemitic conspiracy theories were presented.

Researcher on Nordic nationalism Benjamin R. Teitelbaum described the present day version Sweden Democrats as paradoxical compared to other European nationalist parties on the issues of racism and radicalism. Teitelbaum notes that in contrast to other Nordic and wider European populist parties, the SD differs by having a past rooted in white nationalism and extremism, but in the present day is comparably more proactive in rejecting ethno-nationalism and expelling members who make racist statements to the point where he considers the SD to be on the "softer side" of national-populism. Similar observations were made by British conservative author Douglas Murray who described the SD as undergoing one of the most significant transformations on the European political right from a party on the fringes that openly pushed extreme tendencies to a more mainstream movement that draws on diverse support.

Ashley Fox, leader of the British Conservative MEPs, praised the Sweden Democrats regarding the party's policy decisions on the expulsion of extremist and racist members: "Over the past decade the Sweden Democrats have made progress in reforming themselves, expelling any members displaying unacceptable views or behaviour and diversifying their party base."

Lobbying
The Sweden Democrats came under fire in 2015 for changing their position on profits made by private welfare companies. Before the election in 2014 they favored having restrictions on the amount of profit that welfare companies could take and use for their own gain. Since the election, they have favored the approach of the Alliance parties, that is higher and more restrictive quality standards. This has been suspected to be because of extensive lobbying done by the organisation Svenskt Näringsliv among others. The story was discovered by the Swedish newspaper Dagens Industri on 14 September 2015. SD has denied all accusations of corruption.

Electoral results

Riksdag

European Parliament

Maps

Leadership

Party leader 
 Anders Klarström (19891995)
 Mikael Jansson (19952005)
 Jimmie Åkesson (2005present)

First Deputy Party leader 
 Jonas Åkerlund (20062015)
 Julia Kronlid (20152019)
 Henrik Vinge (2019present)

Second Deputy Party leader 
 Jonas Åkerlund (20052006)
 Anna Hagwall (20062009)
 Carina Ståhl Herrstedt (20092019)
 Julia Kronlid (2019present)

Secretary 
 Jakob Eriksson (19982001)
 Jimmy Windeskog (20012003)
 Torbjörn Kastell (20032004)
 Jan Milld (20042005)
 David Lång (2005)
 Björn Söder (20052015)
 Richard Jomshof (2015present)

Parliamentary group leader 
 Björn Söder (20102014)
 Mattias Karlsson (20142019)
 Henrik Vinge (2019present)

Party spokesmen 
 Leif Zeilon and Jonny Berg (19881989; spokespersons)
 Ola Sundberg and Anders Klarström (19891990; spokespersons)
 Anders Klarström and Madeleine Larsson (19901992; spokespersons)

Other prominent party members 
 Sten Andersson (28 February 194316 August 2010)
 Tommy Funebo
 Dragan Klaric

Internal structure
The Sweden Democrats are made up of 16 districts of local party associations with executive boards. Each district consists of a number of municipal associations, which may include one or more municipalities. In municipalities that are not covered by a municipal association, the party organises its members as working groups instead. The SD also has a centralized national board permanently chaired by the party leader and party secretary and whose other members are elected by the SD's membership base.

Within the SD there is a women's branch SD-Women and an affiliated youth-wing Young Swedes SDU which was founded in 2015. The SD's first youth-wing was founded in 1993 as the Sweden Democratic Youth Association before it was renamed the Sweden Democratic Youth (SDU). The old SDU was disbanded in 1995 due to extremism problems before it was reconstituted in 1998. Many prominent SD politicians including party leader Jimmie Åkesson were members of the SDU. In 2015, the SD announced it would expel the leadership of the SDU from the mother party and officially sever ties with it due to ongoing controversies with its members. The party subsequently created the Young Swedes SDU as a replacement.

Following the 2010 Swedish general election, the SD created its own security unit which by 2014 consisted of an estimated 60 people. SD states that the unit is intended to handle internal issues within the party, including cybersecurity, to marshal public events and to encourage members to report external threats to the police. The SD has argued the security wing is necessary due to threats against SD politicians and highlighted a 2012 report by the Swedish National Council for Crime Prevention which found one in two of every local SD politician had experienced some form of threat, harassment or physical violence, and that SD legislators were statistically twice as more likely to be threatened than members of other parties. SD reported 95 instances of threats or violence against elected officials to the police and Riksdag security in 2012.

Associated organisations and media
Since its founding, the SD has published its own newspaper SD-Kuriren which was previously known as Sverige-Kuriren and then SD Bulletin until 2003. Party secretary Richard Jomshof currently serves as the paper's editor. In 2014, the party also launched an online magazine Samtiden (Contemporary). It is currently edited by Swedish economist Dick Erixon.

In 2020, Mattias Karlsson, the former group leader of the Sweden Democrats in the Riksdag founded Oikos, a conservative think-tank. Expo has alleged the think-tank to be an "extension of the Sweden Democrats' political project" supposedly also receiving funding from the party although the group itself claims to be non-partisan.

In 2020, the party also helped to launch a web based TV channel Riks, through their wholly owned online magazine Samtiden, with the ambition that the media channel should not be an official party TV.

Voter demography
According to the Statistiska Centralbyrån (SCB) 2017 party preference survey the Sweden Democrats (SD) have a stronger support among men than among women. There is no noticeable difference in support for the party among different age groups. The support for SD is greater among native born than among foreign born. Since 2014 the SD has substantially increased its support among both foreign-born and foreign-background voters, becoming the third largest party in Sweden also among this demographic by 2017. Sympathies are greater for the party among persons with primary and secondary education than among those with a higher education. The 2018 party preference survey of the SCB show that SD has twice as much support among men than among women.

A study by Aftonbladet in 2010 found that 14%of SD members were of immigrant origin, which matches the share of foreign-born inhabitants of Sweden, while their vote share in this population group has always been lower. For the 2010 election in the municipality of Södertälje (Stockholm County), SDwas the only party with a majority of immigrants on its electoral list, mostly Assyrians from the Middle East. Polling7.31%(3,447 votes), SD'smunicipal list in Södertälje got 5of the65 municipal seats. Nader Helawi and four other Swedes of immigrant origin will sit as municipal councilors. Since 2014, the SD has seen growing support from foreign-born Swedish voters, and was estimated to have become the third most popular party for voters of immigrant backgrounds by 2017. In recent years, politicians of ethnic minority and immigrant backgrounds have become increasingly active in the party, with notable examples including Nima Gholam Ali Pour, Kent Ekeroth, Sara Gille and Rashid Farivar.

Changes in voter base at the general elections, 2006–2022

See also 
 List of political parties in Sweden

References

Bibliography

External links 

 
 Jimmie Åkesson's website
 SD-Kuriren
 Young Swedes SDU

1988 establishments in Sweden
Anti-immigration politics in Europe
Anti-Islam political parties in Europe
Criticism of Islam
European Conservatives and Reformists member parties
Euronat members
Eurosceptic parties in Sweden
National conservative parties
Nationalist parties in Sweden
Conservative parties in Sweden
Political parties established in 1988
Right-wing populism in Sweden
Right-wing populist parties
Swedish nationalism
Anti-Islam sentiment in Sweden
Social conservative parties
Right-wing parties in Sweden
Far-right politics in Sweden